Carl Louis Gregory (1882–1951) was an American cinematographer and director.

Early life
Carl Louis Gregory was born in Walnut, Kansas, in 1882. He ventured into photography while he was 11 years old. He grew up in Geneva, Ohio, the only boy among many sisters, two of whom, Anne (Anna) and Fana (Fanny) would later act in his silent films. He received degrees in pharmacy and chemistry from the Ohio State University in 1902 and 1904, respectively. He developed an optical printer in 1920 and as a result, his technical expertise was highly valued.

Career

Gregory was senior cameraman for the first major Thanhouser release, St. Elmo. He photographed stills for a couple of advertisements. Gregory was the head instructor at the U. S. Signal School of Cinematography at Columbia University. He also filmed the 1914 serial called The Million Dollar Mystery.

He was on the staff at the National Archives from 1936 to 1946. During his tenure there, he modified a process optical printer and was successful in restoring paper prints with simple techniques. In 1946, Gregory was hired by the Library of Congress, which was trying to acquire the film collection of Mary Pickford. Working in California, he created an inventory of Pickford's collection—films in which she had financial interest, and all of the films in which she appeared.

Death
He died on March 6, 1951, at his home in Van Nuys, California.

Filmography

 Nicholas Nickleby (1912), cinematographer
 The Cry of the Children (1912), cinematographer
 An American in the Making (1913), cinematographer, director
 Her Awakening (1914), director
 The Woman Pays (1914), cinematographer
 An Enemy to Society (1914), cinematographer
 Thirty Leagues Under the Sea (1914) (derived from The Terrors of the Deep), director, cinematographer, screenwriter
 The Patriot and the Spy (1915), cinematographer
 Their One Love (1915), cinematographer
 The Gulf Between (1917), cinematographer
 Queen of the Sea (1918), cinematographer
 Love's Flame (1920), cinematographer, director
 The Fall of the House of Usher (1928), special effects cinematographer

References

External links
 
 
 Carl Louis Gregory at Thanhouser Company Film Preservation, Inc.

American cinematographers
1882 births
1951 deaths
American film directors